Antestiopsis is a genus of shield bug, commonly known as antestia and the variegated coffee bug. Several species in eastern Africa are pests of coffee plants, giving the coffee beans a distinctive 'potato taste', which is thought to be caused indirectly by bacteria entering through wounds created by the insects, leading to an increase in the concentration of isopropyl methoxy pyrazine. They feed on flowers, berries and growing tips, injecting a toxic saliva that often contains the spores of the Ashbya fungus, and then suck juices out.

Species

Species include:
Antestiopsis intricata (Ghesquiere and Carayon)
Antestiopsis thunbergii (Gmelin)

Control
Throughout history, Antestiopsis was controlled in Kenya using pyrethrum powder.

The organophosphate fenthion has been used to control the pest in Burundi.

Laboratory experiments have found the essential oils of Thymus vulgaris, Ruta chalepensis and Chenopodium ambrosioides cause around 90% mortality in Antestiopsis.

References

External links
Antestiopsis Plantwise

Pentatomidae
Coffee diseases
Pentatomomorpha genera